WDNH-FM is a radio station licensed to Honesdale, Pennsylvania, airing a Top 40 format. It airs the Weekly Top 40 with Rick Dees and the Weekend Top 30 with Hollywood Hamilton

External links
Official Site

DNH-FM
Contemporary hit radio stations in the United States
Radio stations established in 1977